Ersin Ayrłksa (born 27 November 1956) is a Turkish alpine skier. He competed in two events at the 1976 Winter Olympics.

References

1956 births
Living people
Turkish male alpine skiers
Olympic alpine skiers of Turkey
Alpine skiers at the 1976 Winter Olympics
People from Bitlis
20th-century Turkish people